Willow Fork (also called Willow Creek) is a stream in Moniteau County in the U.S. state of Missouri. It is a tributary of North Moreau Creek.

Willow Fork was so named due to the presence of willow trees along its course.

See also
List of rivers of Missouri

References

Rivers of Moniteau County, Missouri
Rivers of Missouri